Lal-e-Yaman is a 1933 Indian Bollywood film. It is also known as Parwiz Parizad.

Cast  
Jal Khambatta as The King of Yaman
Karimja as Prince Parviz
Padma as Princess Parizad 
Feroze Dastur as Prince Nadir
Master Mahomed as Pirmard
Sayani as Vazir Jargam
Nazir as Amaldar Fawriz		
B. Khan as the Demon Genie 
Boman Shroff as Apeman
Miss Mohini as Queen Malka
Miss Kamla as Lalarukh
Miss Mayuri as Mehru 
Miss Lola as a dancer

Stunts
 Fearless Nadia

External links
 
 Lal-e-Yaman on YouTube

1933 films
1930s Hindi-language films
Films set in Yemen
Indian fantasy drama films
Films scored by Joseph David
Genies in film